The Grob G 116 was a civil utility aircraft developed in Germany in the late 1980s. It was an enlarged and more powerful four-seat version of the two-seat Grob G 115. Like its predecessor, it was a conventional low-wing cantilever monoplane with fixed tricycle undercarriage. Also like the G 115, construction throughout was of composite materials.

Grob commenced displaying a highly realistic mock-up of the design in 1987, and a prototype flew the following year. However, by 1989 the firm became uncertain about the commercial viability of the aircraft in the face of heavy competition in the four-seat sector, and the project was first postponed and finally cancelled.

Specifications

References
 
 
 
 
 
 

1980s German civil utility aircraft
Grob aircraft
Low-wing aircraft
Single-engined tractor aircraft
Aircraft first flown in 1988